Disaronno Originale (28% abv) is a type of amaretto—an amber-colored liqueur with a characteristic almond taste, although it does not actually contain almonds. It is produced in Saronno, in the Lombardy region, and is sold worldwide. According to the company, the liqueur is an infusion of apricot kernel oil with "absolute alcohol, burnt sugar, and the pure essence of seventeen selected herbs and fruits". The liqueur is sold in an oblong glass decanter designed by a craftsman from Murano.

The product was called Amaretto di Saronno (Amaretto from Saronno) until 2001, when it was rebranded as "Disaronno Originale" for marketing reasons.

The company has promoted a legend about the origin of the drink: 
 In 1525, a Saronno church commissioned artist Bernardino Luini, one of Leonardo da Vinci's pupils, to paint its sanctuary with frescoes. As the church was dedicated to the Virgin Mary, Luini needed to depict the Madonna, but was in need of a model. He found his inspiration in a young widowed innkeeper. As a gift for him, the woman steeped apricot kernels in brandy, producing the first amaretto liqueur.

Disaronno can be served neat as a cordial,  on the rocks, or as part of a cocktail mixed with other alcoholic beverages, cola, ginger ale, or fruit juice. It may also be added to hot chocolate and is an ingredient in the Italian variant of an Irish coffee. The amaretto liqueur can also be used in the Italian dessert Tiramisu.

References

External links
 Official Website

Italian liqueurs
Almonds
Amaretto liqueurs